Porfiados (formerly known as Cría Cuervos) is a Uruguayan punk rock band from Montevideo, Uruguay, formed in 1997. Their actual line-up is vocalist and guitarist Leonardo Sereno, guitarist Nicolás Noroña, bassist Diego Palleiro and drummer Pablo Tice.

History
In 1997, drummer Pablo Tice met bassist Antunez and started the band under the name Cría Cuervos. Vocalist Mauricio Blanco and guitarist Sebastián Tentti joined afterwards rounding up the original line-up. Their first gig happened on October 24, 1997 in El Cielo, a well renowned pub in the underground scene.

In 1998 Leonardo Sereno joined the band as vocalist and singer after Mauricio and Sebastián left the band due to personal issues. The trio continued playing live and recorded their debut album Simple which was released in 1999.

After many shows they decided it was time to release their second studio album and in 2002 they recorded Ahora ó Nunca, featuring a more evolved punk pop sound. This was one of the first Uruguayan albums to be available online for free. During the next two years they kept performing and in 2004 they took part in Pepsi Bandplugged contest.

In 2007 the band released Vendedor de Ilusiones their third album consolidating the band's actual sound. This record was also available for free in their website. It was also the first album to have radio airplay winning the Estamos Rodeados radio contest.

Two years later, in 2009, the band recorded the single Maldito Verano which was featured as the presentation of the homonym radio show. Shortly afterwards Antunez left the band, Diego Palleiro started playing the bass in his place and Nicolás Noroña joined the band to play the guitar completing their actual line-up.

Current lineup
Leonardo Sereno: Lead Vocals, Rhythm Guitar
Nicolás Noroña: Lead Guitar
Diego Palleiro: Bass
Pablo Tice: drums, backing vocals

Discography

Studio albums
Simple (Indie, 1999)
Ahora o Nunca (Indie, 2003)
Vendedor de Ilusiones (Indie, 2005)
Porfiados (Indie, 2010)
Episodio 1: Seres Extraños (Indie, 2016)

EP'S
Maldito Verano (Indie, 2009)
A Cielo Abierto (Indie, 2013)

Compilations
13 (Trece, 2008)

References

External links
Official Website

Pop punk groups
Uruguayan rock music groups
Musical groups established in 1997
1997 establishments in Uruguay